Horatio N. Boshell (January 8, 1872–June 1, 1933) was an American physician and politician.

Boshell was born in Lostant, LaSalle County, Illinois. He went to Illinois Wesleyan University from 1889 to 1892. Boshell graduated from  Rush Medical College in 1895. He practice medicine and surgery in Melvin, Illinois. Boshell served in the United States Medical Corps during World War I and was commissioned a major. Boshell served on the Melvin school board and was a Republican. Boshell also served on the Melvin Board of Trustees and served as president of the village board. Boshell served in the Illinois House of Representatives in 1923 and 1924. Boshell and his wife were killed in an automobile accident near Indian Oaks, Illinois north of Kankakee, Illinois. They were returning home from Chicago, Illinois.

Notes

1872 births
1933 deaths
People from LaSalle County, Illinois
People from Ford County, Illinois
Military personnel from Illinois
Illinois Wesleyan University alumni
Rush Medical College alumni
Physicians from Illinois
School board members in Illinois
Illinois city council members
Mayors of places in Illinois
Republican Party members of the Illinois House of Representatives
Road incident deaths in Illinois
United States Army personnel of World War I